Vidal Llerenas Morales (born 2 February 1972) is a Mexican politician from the National Regeneration Movement. He represents the eighth federal electoral district of Mexico City in the Chamber of Deputies for the LXIII Legislature of the Mexican Congress.

Life
Llerenas Morales graduated with an undergraduate degree in economics from the Instituto Tecnológico Autónomo de México in 1994.

2009 saw Llerenas be elected to the Chamber of Deputies for the first time, as a PRD deputy for the LXI Legislature. He primarily served on financial and accounting-related commissions, including Finances and Public Credit, Budget and Public Accounts, Center for the Study of Public Finances, Economy, Government, Federal District, Special on Competitiveness, and Special for Analysis of Fiscal Expenditures. During this time, Llerenas spent two years as the vice president of the National College of Economists. When his first term in San Lázaro ended, voters sent him to the Legislative Assembly of the Federal District for a three-year term. He presided over the Special Commission for Legislative Studies and served on a myriad of commissions, largely related to budgets and finance. He also presented initiatives supporting the legalization of marijuana.

In 2014, he wrote a book, Progressive Perspectives: Ideas for a Progressive Fiscal Reform.

On 21 February 2015, Llerenas resigned from the PRD, believing that a candidacy for federal deputy under the PRD banner would not be competitive and criticizing the party for not taking into account the political tenure or relationships of potential candidates. Instead, he ran as a candidate for Morena; the PRD promptly claimed that Llerenas was offering food vouchers for votes during a ban on electoral activities. Llerenas won the June 2015 election for the eighth district; much like in the LXI Legislature, he serves on mostly financial commissions, including Budget and Public Accounts, Committee for the Center for the Study of Public Finances, Economy, and Finances and Public Credit.

References

1972 births
Living people
Politicians from Mexico City
Members of the Chamber of Deputies (Mexico) for Mexico City
Party of the Democratic Revolution politicians
Morena (political party) politicians
21st-century Mexican politicians
Instituto Tecnológico Autónomo de México alumni
Alumni of the University of Essex
Alumni of the University of York
Members of the Congress of Mexico City
Deputies of the LXIII Legislature of Mexico